Hinchliffe Stadium is a 10,000-seat stadium located in Paterson, New Jersey. The venue was completed in 1932 and sits on a dramatic escarpment above Paterson's National Historic Landmark Great Falls, surrounded by the city's national landmark historic district, the first planned industrial settlement in the nation (chartered 1792). Hinchliffe stadium is known for hosting track and field, football, baseball, entertainment events, and auto and motorcycle racing. It is one of only a handful of stadiums surviving nationally that once played host to significant Negro league baseball during America's Jim Crow era.  The stadium was designated a National Historic Landmark in March 2013 and a Paterson Historic Landmark in May 2013. In December 2014, Congress passed legislation to include the stadium in the Great Falls National Landmark District.

Early days
The stadium, a large concrete oval with near-continuous seating laid out like a classical amphitheater, was inspired by a decade-long popular "stadium movement" in the 1920s, and was finally brought to fruition through the persistent efforts of its namesake Mayor John Hinchliffe, who made his fortune from Hinchliffe Brewing before it closed due to Prohibition. It opened on July 8, 1932, as a combination athletic facility and a "paying investment" for the working people of industrial Paterson, New Jersey, who were by then struggling through the early years of the Great Depression. Many workers laid off from the mills found work under a New Deal-financed program to provide enhancements to the stadium in 1932–34.

The stadium immediately played host to Negro league and "barnstorming" games.  In 1933, the stadium's first complete season hosting baseball, Hinchliffe hosted the Colored Championship of the Nation, the Negro leagues equivalent of the World Series. That following year, the New York Black Yankees made the stadium their home, a tenure that lasted until 1945 and was interrupted only once, when the team booked Triborough Stadium on Randall's Island in New York for the 1938 season.  After World War II, the Black Yankees left Hinchliffe and took up residency at Red Wing Stadium in Rochester, New York. Hinchliffe was also home to the New York Cubans in 1935 and 1936.

The baseball played at Hinchliffe Stadium was some of the best and most competitive in the game, including prodigious athletes like Monte Irvin, Josh Gibson, Oscar Charleston, and "Cool Papa" Bell, among many others. Hall-of-Famer Larry Doby, the legendary player who broke the American League color barrier in 1947, grew up in Paterson playing football and baseball in Hinchliffe Stadium for Paterson's Eastside High School, and was scouted from Hinchliffe for the Newark Eagles in 1942.

Hinchliffe became an important venue for boxing (Diamond Gloves, precursor to the Golden Gloves), auto racing (precursor to NASCAR featuring stock car racing, pre-Indianapolis racing, and midget car racing events), and professional football.  Racers that appeared at Hinchliffe included Dutch Schaefer, Ted Horn, Bill Schindler, Art Cross, and Tex Keene.  Victory Bond rallies held at the stadium during World War II drew sports stars and New York and Hollywood celebrities by the dozens. Among the many notable events headlined at Hinchliffe were shows performed by Abbott and Costello. (Lou Costello was born and raised in Paterson's Eastside section.)

Throughout its history, though, Hinchliffe Stadium's primary use was as a venue for Paterson high school sports. Its two high schools, Eastside High School and Central High School, shared the stadium for various sports including football and baseball until the late 1960s. (Kennedy High School, opened in 1965, also used Hinchliffe.) The schools' annual intercity Thanksgiving Day matchup was always held at Hinchliffe, and the venue would also play host to other schools' teams who took advantage of its large capacity; for instance, Paterson's neighbor Clifton used the stadium for its football team during the 1940s until opening its own Stadium October 14, 1950.

Later days
At first Hinchliffe, sometimes called "City Stadium", was municipally owned. In 1963, as the schools assumed full ownership, they undertook an array of repairs and upgrades that included repositioning the baseball diamond and adding fill to the area above and along the river (the "cliff" area, called "The Valley of the Rocks") in order to enlarge the football field and lengthen the track. In the following decades, the stadium did yeoman service for both school sports and major public events, including—from the 1970s on—concerts, antique car shows, and the fireworks displays for the Great Falls Festivals that have become a favorite feature of Paterson's Labor Day celebrations. Duke Ellington held one of his last major concerts here in 1971.

In 1983, the field received another upgrade under Mayor Frank X. Graves, Jr. These repairs made previously temporary stands permanent, added handicap access and storage facilities, and resulted in the installation of an Astroturf field surface. In 1988 Hinchliffe Stadium became the home of the New Jersey Eagles of the American Soccer League, and the Eagles called the stadium home for two seasons before moving to another venue for their third and final season.

The general decline of the school system in Paterson over the next decade meant the diversion of maintenance resources away from the stadium. Although the facility continued to be used through the 1990s, Hincliffe Stadium fell into further and further disrepair due to underfunding and was eventually closed at the end of the 1996–97 school year and threatened with demolition. This forced Eastside High School and Kennedy High School to play their entire 1997 football seasons on the road and both schools returned to playing in Paterson for the 1998 season at Bauerle Field, located near Eastside High School.

The threat of demolition sparked a new movement to find ways and means of restoring and revitalizing this historic venue. A group of local citizens formed the non-profit Friends of Hinchliffe Stadium, announcing in September 2002, on the 70th anniversary of the stadium's dedication. A month later, Schools Superintendent Edwin Duroy announced a proposal to revitalize the facility into a stadium complex. The National Register of Historic Places designation by the State Office of Historic Preservation deemed Hinchliffe as only "locally significant", even though segregation and the Negro leagues were of national prominence. This cost the stadium much-needed funding from the Save America's Treasures grant funding program.

Current efforts
Hinchliffe Stadium is currently undergoing revitalization, with an anticipated reopening in 2023. Former Mayor Jose Torres's non-binding bond resolution for restoring the stadium received round public endorsement on the local ballot in 2005, and the schools showed interest in mounting a funding drive to not only bring the stadium back to its former glory but revitalize it as both a multiplex sports facility (basketball, swimming, ice hockey) and a Sports Business Academy for the school district. There has been some discussion about making it an enhancement to New Jersey's planned "urban park" for the Great Falls through extension of landmark protection to the stadium, a project that would incorporate into a single thematic cultural landscape the cluster of three historic sites: Paterson's Great Falls, the National Landmark Industrial District, and Hinchliffe Stadium.  On May 19, 2010, the stadium was designated one of the 11 Most Endangered Historic Places for 2010 by the National Trust for Historic Preservation.

The voters of Paterson approved a ballot initiative to renovate the crumbling stadium in November 2009. The Hinchliffe renovations are part of a large-scale project which will also see renovations to Bauerle Field, the current home of Paterson's public high school football and track teams, and the Paterson Armory; the majority of the money, nearly $13 million, will go to restoring Hinchliffe Stadium.

The former mayor of Paterson, Joey Torres, had committed to seeing the restoration of the stadium by the end of his term in 2018, but left office in 2017 and accepted a plea deal in response to charges of corruption.  Further improvements to the stadium continue with the efforts to upgrade the area around the Paterson Great Falls National Historic Park. In March 2018, a $500,000 grant from the federal African American Civil Rights grant program of the National Park Service and the federal African American Civil Rights grant program was provided to renovate the facility's exterior facade. In April 2019, Mayor Andre Sayegh proposed $18.7 million in repairs to reopen Hinchfliffe Stadium as a facility for baseball, soccer, football, and track.

In 2021 ground was broken on a  $94 million project to renovate the stadium.

It has been confirmed starting in the 2023 season that the New Jersey Jackals will be playing at the stadium after moving from Yogi Berra Stadium.

See also

 Paterson Public Schools
 Paterson Great Falls National Historical Park
 Ruppert Stadium (Newark)

Some Negro league ballparks that are still standing or rebuilt elsewhere include:
 Josh Gibson Field in Pittsburgh, Pennsylvania is still standing and was renovated in 2008.
 McCormick Field in Asheville, North Carolina was originally built in 1924 then used in the 1940s by the Asheville Blues. It was rebuilt in 1992 is used as a ballpark by the Tourists.
 Rickwood Field in Birmingham, Alabama is still standing and is an active sports venue and museum.

References

Further reading

External links

 Friends of Hinchliffe Stadium
 Digital Ballparks - Hinchliffe Stadium
 Hinchliffe Stadium Documentary produced by The City Concealed
 
 Hinchliffe Stadium 2018 Images and history

Sports venues in New Jersey
Buildings and structures in Paterson, New Jersey
Sports venues on the National Register of Historic Places in New Jersey
National Historic Landmarks in New Jersey
Negro league baseball venues
Sports venues completed in 1932
Soccer venues in New Jersey
Defunct soccer venues in the United States
Motorsport venues in New Jersey
Buildings and structures in Passaic County, New Jersey
Tourist attractions in Passaic County, New Jersey
Sports in Paterson, New Jersey
National Register of Historic Places in Passaic County, New Jersey
New Jersey Register of Historic Places
African-American history of New Jersey
Negro league baseball venues still standing
1932 establishments in New Jersey
Baseball venues in New Jersey
High school baseball venues in the United States
High school football venues in the United States
American football venues in New Jersey